The Selimiye Tunnel is a road tunnel constructed on the  Black Sea Coastal Highway   between Hopa and Kemalpaşa in Artvin Province, northeastern Turkey.

Situated near Selimiye village, the -long single-tube tunnel carries two lanes of traffic in east-bound direction only. Selimiye Tunnel is flanked by a series of shorter tunnels on the same route. 

The construction of the tunnel was preceded by a major landslide, which occurs often in the region. After the east-bound part of divided highway was blocked by a landslide, traffic was maintained a long time on the west-bound part. The problem was solved by building of a series of tunnels built on the east-bound highway part in the vicinity of Selimiye village. The construction works began on 25 August 2009. In October 2010, the tunnel was put into service. During the road maintenance period, Selimiye Tunnel was used bi-directional.

References

Road tunnels in Turkey
Transport in Artvin Province